Harold Hart Crane (July 21, 1899 – April 27, 1932) was an American poet. Provoked and inspired by T. S. Eliot, Crane wrote modernist poetry that was difficult, highly stylized, and ambitious in its scope. In his most ambitious work, The Bridge, Crane sought to write an epic poem, in the vein of The Waste Land, that expressed a more optimistic view of modern, urban culture than the one that he found in Eliot's work. In the years following his suicide at the age of 32, Crane has been hailed by playwrights, poets, and literary critics alike (including Robert Lowell, Derek Walcott, Tennessee Williams, and Harold Bloom), as being one of the most influential poets of his generation.

Life and work
Crane was born in Garrettsville, Ohio, the son of Clarence A. Crane and Grace Edna Hart. His father was a successful Ohio businessman who invented the Life Savers candy and held the patent, but sold it for $2,900 before the brand became popular. He made other candy and accumulated a fortune from the candy business with chocolate bars. Crane's mother and father were constantly fighting, and they divorced early in April 1917. Crane dropped out of East High School in Cleveland during his junior year and left for New York City, promising his parents he would attend Columbia University later. His parents, in the middle of their divorce proceedings, were upset. Crane took various copywriting jobs and moved between friends' apartments in Manhattan. Between 1917 and 1924 he moved back and forth between New York and Cleveland, working as an advertising copywriter and a worker in his father's factory. From Crane's letters, it appears that New York was where he felt most at home, and much of his poetry is set there.

Career
Throughout the early 1920s, small but well-respected literary magazines published some of Crane's poems, gaining him among the avant-garde a respect that White Buildings (1926), his first volume, ratified and strengthened. White Buildings contains many of Crane's best poems, including "For the Marriage of Faustus and Helen", and "Voyages", a sequence of erotic poems. They were written while he was falling in love with Emil Opffer, a Danish merchant mariner. "Faustus and Helen" was part of a larger artistic struggle to meet modernity with something more than despair. Crane identified T. S. Eliot with that kind of despair, and while he acknowledged the greatness of The Waste Land, he also said it was "so damned dead", an impasse, and characterized by a refusal to see "certain spiritual events and possibilities". Crane's self-appointed work would be to bring those spiritual events and possibilities to poetic life, and so create "a mystical synthesis of America".

Crane returned to New York in 1928, living with friends and taking temporary jobs as a copywriter, or living off unemployment and the charity of friends and his father. For a time he lived in Brooklyn at 77 Willow Street until his lover, Opffer, invited him to live in Opffer's father's home at 110 Columbia Heights in Brooklyn Heights. Crane was overjoyed at the views the location afforded him. He wrote his mother and grandmother in the spring of 1924:
Just imagine looking out your window directly on the East River with nothing intervening between your view of the Statue of Liberty, way down the harbour, and the marvelous beauty of Brooklyn Bridge close above you on your right! All of the great new skyscrapers of lower Manhattan are marshaled directly across from you, and there is a constant stream of tugs, liners, sail boats, etc in procession before you on the river! It's really a magnificent place to live. This section of Brooklyn is very old, but all the houses are in splendid condition and have not been invaded by foreigners...

His ambition to synthesize America was expressed in The Bridge (1930), intended to be an uplifting counter to Eliot's The Waste Land. The Brooklyn Bridge is both the poem's central symbol and its poetic starting point. Crane found a place to start his synthesis in Brooklyn. Arts patron Otto H. Kahn gave him $2,000 to begin work on the epic poem. When he wore out his welcome at the Opffers', Crane left for Paris in early 1929, but failed to leave his personal problems behind. His drinking, always a problem, became notably worse during the late 1920s, while he was finishing The Bridge.

In Paris in February 1929, Harry Crosby, who with his wife Caresse Crosby owned the fine arts press Black Sun Press, offered Crane the use of their country retreat, Le Moulin du Soleil in Ermenonville. They hoped he could use the time to concentrate on completing The Bridge. Crane spent several weeks at their estate where he roughed out a draft of the "Cape Hatteras" section, a key part of his epic poem. In late June that year, Crane returned from the south of France to Paris. Crosby noted in his journal, "Hart C. back from Marseilles where he slept with his thirty sailors and he began again to drink Cutty Sark." Crane got drunk at the Cafe Select and fought with waiters over his tab. When the Paris police were called, he fought with them and was beaten. They arrested and jailed him, fining him 800 francs. After Hart had spent six days in prison at La Santé, Crosby paid Crane's fine and advanced him money for the passage back to the United States, where he finally finished The Bridge. The work received poor reviews, and Crane's sense of failure became crushing.

Death
Crane visited Mexico in 1931–32 on a Guggenheim Fellowship, and his drinking continued as he suffered from bouts of alternating depression and elation.  When Peggy Cowley, wife of his friend Malcolm Cowley, agreed to a divorce, she joined Crane. As far as is known, she was his only heterosexual partner. "The Broken Tower", one of his last published poems, emerged from that affair. Crane still felt himself a failure, in part because he recommenced his homosexual activities in spite of his relationship with Cowley.

While en route to New York aboard the steamship Orizaba, he was beaten up after making sexual advances to a male crew member. Just before noon on April 27, 1932, Crane jumped overboard into the Gulf of Mexico. Although he had been drinking heavily and left no suicide note, witnesses believed his intentions to be suicidal, as several reported that he exclaimed "Goodbye, everybody!" before throwing himself overboard. His body was never recovered. A marker on his father's tombstone at Park Cemetery outside Garrettsville, Portage County, Ohio includes the inscription, "Harold Hart Crane 1899–1932 lost at sea".

Poetics
Crane's critical effort, like those of Keats and Rilke, is mostly to be found in his letters: he corresponded regularly with Allen Tate, Yvor Winters, and Gorham Munson, and shared critical dialogues with Eugene O'Neill, William Carlos Williams, E. E. Cummings, Sherwood Anderson, Kenneth Burke, Waldo Frank, Harriet Monroe, Marianne Moore, and Gertrude Stein. He was also an acquaintance of H. P. Lovecraft, who eventually would voice concern over Crane's premature aging due to alcohol abuse. Most serious work on Crane begins with his letters, selections of which are available in many editions of his poetry; his letters to Munson, Tate, Winters, and his patron, Otto Hermann Kahn, are particularly insightful. His two most famous stylistic defenses emerged from correspondences: his "General Aims and Theories" (1925) was written to urge Eugene O'Neill's critical foreword to White Buildings, then passed around among friends, yet unpublished during Crane's life; and the famous "Letter to Harriet Monroe" (1926) was part of an exchange for the publication of "At Melville's Tomb" in Poetry.

The literary critic Adam Kirsch has argued that "[Crane has been] a special case in the canon of American modernism, his reputation never quite as secure as that of Eliot or Stevens."

"Logic of metaphor"
As with Eliot's "objective correlative", a certain vocabulary haunts Crane criticism, his "logic of metaphor" being perhaps the most vexed. His most quoted formulation is in the circulated, if long unpublished, "General Aims and Theories": "As to technical considerations: the motivation of the poem must be derived from the implicit emotional dynamics of the materials used, and the terms of expression employed are often selected less for their logical (literal) significance than for their associational meanings. Via this and their metaphorical inter-relationships, the entire construction of the poem is raised on the organic principle of a 'logic of metaphor,' which antedates our so-called pure logic, and which is the genetic basis of all speech, hence consciousness and thought-extension."

There is also some mention of it, though it is not so much presented as a critical neologism, in his letter to Harriet Monroe: "The logic of metaphor is so organically entrenched in pure sensibility that it can't be thoroughly traced or explained outside of historical sciences, like philology and anthropology." L. S. Dembo's influential study of The Bridge, Hart Crane's Sanskrit Charge (1960), reads this 'logic' well within the familiar rhetoric of the Romantics: "The Logic of metaphor was simply the written form of the 'bright logic' of the imagination, the crucial sign stated, the Word made words.... As practiced, the logic of metaphor theory is reducible to a fairly simple linguistic principle: the symbolized meaning of an image takes precedence over its literal meaning; regardless of whether the vehicle of an image makes sense, the reader is expected to grasp its tenor.

Difficulty

The publication of White Buildings was delayed by Eugene O'Neill's struggle (and eventual failure) to articulate his appreciation in a foreword to it; and many critics since have used Crane's difficulty as an excuse for a quick dismissal. Even a young Tennessee Williams, then falling in love with Crane's poetry, could "hardly understand a single line—of course the individual lines aren't supposed to be intelligible. The message, if there actually is one, comes from the total effect.".  It was not lost on Crane, then, that his poetry was difficult. Some of his best, and practically only, essays originated as encouraging epistles: explications and stylistic apologies to editors, updates to his patron, and the variously well-considered or impulsive letters to his friends. It was, for instance, only his exchange with Harriet Monroe at Poetry, when she initially refused to print "At Melville's Tomb", that urged Crane to describe his "logic of metaphor" in print. And describe it he did, then complaining: 
"If the poet is to be held completely to the already evolved and exploited sequences of imagery and logic—what field of added consciousness and increased perceptions (the actual province of poetry, if not lullabies) can be expected when one has to relatively return to the alphabet every breath or two? In the minds of people who have sensitively read, seen, and experienced a great deal, isn't there a terminology something like short-hand as compared to usual description and dialectics, which the artist ought to be right in trusting as a reasonable connective agent toward fresh concepts, more inclusive evaluations?"

Monroe was not impressed, though she acknowledged that others were, and printed the exchange alongside the poem: "You find me testing metaphors, and poetic concept in general, too much by logic, whereas I find you pushing logic to the limit in a painfully intellectual search for emotion, for poetic motive." In any case, Crane had a relatively well-developed rhetoric for the defense of his poems; here is an excerpt from "General Aims and Theories": "New conditions of life germinate new forms of spiritual articulation. ...the voice of the present, if it is to be known, must be caught at the risk of speaking in idioms and circumlocutions sometimes shocking to the scholar and historians of logic."

"Homosexual text"
As a boy, he had a sexual relationship with a man. He associated his sexuality with his vocation as a poet. Raised in the Christian Science tradition of his mother, he never ceased to view himself as a social pariah. However, as poems such as "Repose of Rivers" make clear, he felt that this sense of alienation was necessary in order for him to attain the visionary insight that formed the basis for his poetic work.

Recent criticism has suggested reading Crane's poems—"The Broken Tower", "My Grandmother's Love Letters", the "Voyages" series, and others—with an eye to homosexual meanings in the text. Queer theorist Tim Dean argues, for instance, that the obscurity of Crane's style owes partially to the necessities of being a semi-public homosexual—not quite closeted, but also, as legally and culturally necessary, not open: "The intensity responsible for Crane's particular form of difficulty involves not only linguistic considerations but also culturally subjective concerns. This intensity produces a kind of privacy that is comprehensible in terms of the cultural construction of homosexuality and its attendant institutions of privacy."

Thomas Yingling objects to the traditional, New Critical and Eliotic readings of Crane, arguing that the "American myth criticism and formalist readings" have "depolarized and normalized our reading of American poetry, making any homosexual readings seem perverse." Even more than a personal or political problem, though, Yingling argues that such "biases" obscure much of what the poems make clear; he cites, for instance, the last lines of "My Grandmother's Love Letters" from White Buildings as a haunting description of estrangement from the norms of (heterosexual) family life:

Brian Reed has contributed to a project of critical reintegration of queer criticism with other critical methods, suggesting that an overemphasis on the sexual biography of Crane's poetry can skew a broader appreciation of his overall work. In one example of Reed's approach, he published a close reading of Crane's lyric poem, "Voyages", (a love poem that Crane wrote for his lover Emil Opffer) on the Poetry Foundation website, analyzing the poem based strictly on the content of the text itself and not on outside political or cultural matters.

Influence
Crane was admired by artists including Allen Tate, Eugene O'Neill, Kenneth Burke, Edmund Wilson, E. E. Cummings and William Carlos Williams. Although Crane had his sharp critics, among them Marianne Moore and Ezra Pound, Moore did publish his work, as did T. S. Eliot, who, moving even further out of Pound's sphere, may have borrowed some of Crane's imagery for Four Quartets, in the beginning of East Coker, which is reminiscent of the final section of "The River", from The Bridge.

Important mid-century American poets, such as John Berryman and Robert Lowell, cited Crane as a significant influence. Both poets also wrote about Crane in their poetry. Berryman wrote him one of his famous elegies in The Dream Songs, and Lowell published his "Words for Hart Crane" in Life Studies (1959): "Who asks for me, the Shelley of my age, / must lay his heart out for my bed and board." Lowell thought that Crane was the most important American poet of the generation to come of age in the 1920s, stating that "[Crane] got out more than anybody else ... he somehow got New York City; he was at the center of things in the way that no other poet was." Lowell also described Crane as being "less limited than any other poet of his generation."

Perhaps most reverently, Tennessee Williams said that he wanted to be "given back to the sea" at the "point most nearly determined as the point at which Hart Crane gave himself back". One of Williams's last plays, a "ghost play" titled Steps Must Be Gentle,  explores Crane's relationship with his mother.

In a 1991 interview with Antonio Weiss of The Paris Review, the literary critic Harold Bloom talked about how Crane, along with William Blake, initially sparked his interest in literature at a very young age: I was preadolescent, ten or eleven years old. I still remember the extraordinary delight, the extraordinary force that Crane and Blake brought to me—in particular Blake's rhetoric in the longer poems—though I had no notion what they were about. I picked up a copy of The Collected Poems of Hart Crane in the Bronx Library. I still remember when I lit upon the page with the extraordinary trope, "O Thou steeled Cognizance whose leap commits / The agile precincts of the lark's return." I was just swept away by it, by the Marlovian rhetoric. I still have the flavor of that book in me. Indeed it's the first book I ever owned. I begged my oldest sister to give it to me, and I still have the old black and gold edition she gave me for my birthday back in 1942 . . . I suppose the only poet of the twentieth century that I could secretly set above Yeats and Stevens would be Hart Crane.

More recently, the American poet Gerald Stern wrote an essay on Crane in which he stated, "Some, when they talk about Crane, emphasize his drinking, his chaotic life, his self-doubt, and the dangers of his sexual life, but he was able to manage these things, even though he died at 32, and create a poetry that was tender, attentive, wise, and radically original." At the conclusion of his essay, Stern writes, "Crane is always with me, and whatever I wrote, short poem or long, strange or unstrange—his voice, his tone, his sense of form, his respect for life, his love of the word, his vision have affected me. But I don't want, in any way, to exploit or appropriate this amazing poet whom I am, after all, so different from, he who may be, finally, the great poet, in English, of the twentieth century."

Such important affections have made Crane a "poet's poet". Thomas Lux offered, for instance: "If the devil came to me and said 'Tom, you can be dead and Hart can be alive,' I'd take the deal in a heartbeat if the devil promised, when arisen, Hart would have to go straight into A.A."

Yvor Winters, noted for generally-stern criticism, praised some of Crane's poetry in In Defense of Reason, though he heavily criticized Crane's works and poetics.

Beyond poetry, Crane's suicide inspired several works of art by noted artist Jasper Johns, including "Periscope", "Land's End", and "Diver", as well as the "Symphony for Three Orchestras" by Elliott Carter (inspired by The Bridge) and the painting Eight Bells' Folly, Memorial for Hart Crane by Marsden Hartley.

Depictions
Crane is the subject of The Broken Tower, a 2011 American student film by the actor James Franco who wrote, directed, and starred in the film which was the master's thesis project for his MFA in filmmaking at New York University. He loosely based his script on Paul Mariani's 1999 nonfiction book The Broken Tower: A Life of Hart Crane. Despite being a student film, The Broken Tower was shown at the Los Angeles Film Festival in 2011 and received DVD distribution in 2012 by Focus World Films.

Crane appears as a character in Samuel R. Delany's story "Atlantis: Model 1924", and in The Illuminatus! Trilogy by Robert Shea and Robert Anton Wilson.

Bibliography
White Buildings (1926)
The Bridge (1930)
The Collected Poems of Hart Crane, Ed.Waldo Frank), Boriswood (1938)
Hart Crane and Yvor Winters: Their Literary Correspondence, ed. Thomas Parkinson, Berkeley: University of California Press (1978)
O My Land, My Friends: The Selected Letters of Hart Crane, New York: Four Walls Eight Windows (1997)
The Complete Poems of Hart Crane, ed. Marc Simon, New York: Liveright (1986)
Hart Crane: Complete Poems and Selected Letters, ed. Langdon Hammer, New York: The Library of America (2006)

See also

Modernist poetry in English
American poetry
Appalachian Spring
 Poems from the Greenberg manuscript: a selection of the poems of Samuel Bernard Greenberg, the unknown poet who influenced HART CRANE ; edited, with biographical notes, by James Laughlin; New, expanded edition, edited by Garrett Caples, New York : New Directions Publishing, 2019,

Notes

References

Further reading

Biographies
Fisher, Clive. Hart Crane: A Life. New Haven: Yale University Press, 2002. .
Horton, Philip. Hart Crane: The Life of An American Poet. New York: W.W. Norton & Company, 1937.
Meaker, M.J. Sudden Endings, 13 Profiles in Depth of Famous Suicides. Garden, NY: Doubleday & Company, Inc., 1964. pp. 108–133.
Mariani, Paul. The Broken Tower: A Life of Hart Crane. New York: W.W. Norton & Company, 1999. .
Unterecker, John. Voyager: A Life of Hart Crane. New York: Farrar, Straus and Giroux, 1969.
Weber, Brom. Hart Crane: A Biographical and Critical Study. New York: The Bodley Press, 1948.

Selected criticism

Combs, Robert. Vision of the Voyage: Hart Crane and the Psychology of Romanticism. Memphis, Tennessee: Memphis State University Press, 1978.
Corn, Alfred. "Hart Crane's 'Atlantis'". The Metamorphoses of Metaphor. New York: Viking, 1987.
Dean, Tim. "Hart Crane's Poetics of Privacy". American Literary History 8:1, 1996.
Dembo, L. S. Hart Crane's Sanskrit Charge: A Study of The Bridge. Ithaca, New York: Cornell University Press, 1960).
Gabriel, Daniel. Hart Crane and the Modernist Epic: Canon and Genre Formation in Crane, Pound, Eliot and Williams. New York: Palgrave Macmillan, 2007.
Grossman, Allen. "Hart Crane and Poetry: A Consideration of Crane's Intense Poetics With Reference to 'The Return'". ELH 48:4, 1981.
Grossman, Allen. "On Communicative Difficulty in General and 'Difficult' Poetry in Particular: The Example of Hart Crane's 'The Broken Tower'". Poem Present lecture series at the University of Chicago, 2004.
Hammer, Langdon. Hart Crane & Allen Tate: Janus-Faced Modernism. Princeton, NJ: Princeton University Press, 1993.
Hanley, Alfred. Hart Crane's Holy Vision: "White Buildings". Pittsburgh, Pennsylvania: Duquesne University Press, 1981.
Herman, Barbara. "The Language of Hart Crane", The Sewanee Review 58, 1950.
Lewis, R. W. B. The Poetry of Hart Crane: A Critical Study. Princeton, NJ: Princeton University Press, 1967.
Munro, Niall. Hart Crane's Queer Modernist Aesthetic. New York: Palgrave Macmillan, 2015.
Nickowitz, Peter. Rhetoric and Sexuality: The Poetry of Hart Crane, Elizabeth Bishop, and James Merrill. New York: Palgrave Macmillan, 2006.
Pease, Donald. "Blake, Crane, Whitman, and Modernism: A Poetics of Pure Possibility". PMLA 96:1, 1981.
Ramsey, Roger. "A Poetics for The Bridge". Twentieth Century Literature 26:3, 1980.
Reed, Brian. "Hart Crane's Victrola". Modernism/Modernity 7.1, 2000.
Reed, Brian. Hart Crane: After His Lights. Tuscaloosa, AL: University of Alabama Press, 2006.
Riddel, Joseph. "Hart Crane's Poetics of Failure". ELH 33, 1966.
Rowe, John Carlos. "The 'Super-Historical' Sense of Hart Crane's The Bridge". Genre 11:4, 1978.
Schwartz, Joseph. Hart Crane: A Reference Guide. Boston: G.K. Hall & Co., 1983.
Michael Snediker. "Hart Crane's Smile". Modernism/modernity 12.4, 2005.
Trachtenberg, Alan. Brooklyn Bridge: Fact and Symbol. Chicago: University of Chicago Press, 1979.
Unterecker, John. "The Architecture of The Bridge". Wisconsin Studies in Contemporary Literature 3:2, 1962.
Winters, Yvor. "The Progress of Hart Crane". Poetry 36, June 1930.
Winters, Yvor In Defense of Reason. New York: The Swallow Press and William Morrow, 1947.
 Woods, Gregory, "Articulate Flesh: Male Homo-eroticism and Modern Poetry". New Haven & London: Yale University Press, 1987.
Yannella, Philip R. "'Inventive Dust': The Metamorphoses of 'For the Marriage of Faustus and Helen'". Contemporary Literature 15, 1974.
Yingling, Thomas E. Hart Crane and the Homosexual Text: New Thresholds, New Anatomies. Chicago: University of Chicago Press, 1990.

External links 

 Yale College Lecture on Hart Crane audio, video and full transcripts from Open Yale Courses
 The Fales Library of NYU's guide to the Richard W. Rychtarik/Hart Crane Papers
 Academy of American Poets
 Poetry Foundation profile
 Brian Reed on Voyages (at Poetry Foundation)
 Modern American Poetry: Hart Crane (1899–1932)
 A Great American Visionary Colm Tóibín essay on Crane and review of his selected poems and letters from The New York Review of Books
 Hart Crane on Fire A Selection of Crane's Letters
 
Finding aid to Hart Crane papers at Columbia University. Rare Book & Manuscript Library.

1899 births
1932 deaths
1932 suicides
People from Garrettsville, Ohio
American male poets
Formalist poets
Suicides by drowning in the United States
People from Greenwich Village
Suicides in Florida
American LGBT poets
LGBT people from Ohio
Poets from Ohio
20th-century American poets
LGBT-related suicides
20th-century American male writers
People lost at sea
Lost Generation writers
20th-century LGBT people
Poètes maudits